Bruno Madrigal is a fictional character who appears in Walt Disney Animation Studios' 60th feature, Encanto (2021). Voiced by John Leguizamo, he is Mirabel's ostracized uncle who has the ability to see the future. He is the subject of the song "We Don't Talk About Bruno" (2021).

Development 
Bruno was originally younger, around the same age as Mirabel, and depicted as "kind of a chubbier, funnier uncle who she met earlier in the movie", according to co-director Byron Howard. His original name was Oscar, but the creative team explored other options due to the number of real-life Oscar Madrigals in Colombia. Songwriter Lin-Manuel Miranda chose Bruno from a list of potential names, including Arlo, Andre, Anko, Marco, and Emo, because it allowed for the catchy line "We don't talk about Bruno no no no" in the Encanto song "We Don't Talk About Bruno".

Emerald green was chosen as the main color because of the emerald trade of Colombia and for its mystical properties, such as the usage of emeralds to predict the future. The Quimbaya were used as a resource in designing Bruno. One idea for Bruno's costume was to have him wear a rug he found around the house. The final version of his costume is a ruana "meant to be the old ceremonial outfit that he used to wear when he was having visions of the future for the people that came to see him", according to visual development artist Meg Park.

Character 

Bruno is the youngest member of a set of fraternal triplets born to Alma and Pedro Madrigal, and the only male child of the three. With the exception of his 15-year-old niece, Mirabel, every member of the family receives a magical gift on their fifth birthday; Bruno's gift is the ability of precognition. After Mirabel fails to receive a gift, Bruno (then 40 years old) is asked to conjure a vision to find out why and sees her standing in front of a broken Casita, their sentient home. Knowing that this vision would put Mirabel at odds with the rest of the family and the residents of the town who rely on the magic for help in their everyday lives, Bruno smashes the slab of glass bearing the vision and goes into hiding, concealing himself within the house's walls so he can still be near the family.

Ten years later, when the movie takes place, Mirabel worries that the magic is breaking and questions other family members, discovering that Bruno might know something. In the song "We Don't Talk About Bruno", members of the Madrigal family and the town tell Mirabel about how Bruno foresaw mostly negative events, and they blame him for their misfortunes. Mirabel later finds Bruno in the walls of the house, and he explains that this particular vision would change, and that its meaning was suggesting that she may either destroy the family or remedy its troubles. At Mirabel's urging, he conjures a new vision that shows her what she needs to do in order to save the family. The Casita ultimately collapses, and Mirabel flees, but the arrival of both her grandmother Alma and Bruno cheers her. Alma and Bruno reconcile, and Bruno is welcomed back into the family and helps them and the townspeople rebuild the Casita.

Reception 
Viewers have theorized that Bruno might be neurodivergent or have a mental illness. Princess Weekes of The Mary Sue wrote that Bruno represents a common pattern in families, that of "depressed outsiders who love their family, but feel like their presence does more harm than good". Therapist Kadesha Adelakun, who was interviewed by CNN, shared how people identify with Bruno: "We have family members who are also neurodivergent or have mental health issues, and because they're different, they get shunned, or they're not spoken about."

References

Works cited

Walt Disney Animation Studios characters
Encanto
Fantasy film characters
Fictional Colombian people
Fictional characters who use magic
Fictional characters with precognition
Fictional hermits
Fictional triplets
Film characters introduced in 2021
Male characters in animated films